The Treasury of National Jewels is a museum in Iran. It reopened to public in 1992 after years of being removed from view.

Affiliated with the Central Bank of Iran, it stores and exhibits the Iranian National Jewels as their legal custodian. In the 1930s, the collection grew so valuable that it was used as a reserve for the currency of Iran, and is today considered one of world's famous collections of diamond and other jewels. According to Financial Tribune, "putting a price on the collection would not be possible".

Collection 
Some of the items maintained in the museum with an article on Wikipedia include the following:
 Samarian spinel (Spinel)
 Nader Shah's Sword
 Naderi Throne
 Sun Throne
 Noor-ul-Ain (Diamond)
 Daria-i-Noor (Diamond)
 Kiani Crown
 Pahlavi Crown
 Empress Crown
 Golden Belt (Emerald)

References

External links
Official website

Jewellery museums
1955 establishments in Iran
Museums in Tehran
National museums of Iran
Museums established in 1955
Tourist attractions in Tehran